Dylan Jarin Lupton (born December 7, 1993) is an American professional stock car racing driver who last competed part-time in the NASCAR Camping World Truck Series, driving the No. 7 Chevrolet Silverado for Spire Motorsports. He has also competed in the NASCAR Cup Series, NASCAR Xfinity Series, ARCA Menards Series, what is now the ARCA Menards Series East, and the ARCA Menards Series West in the past.

Racing career

Lupton began racing in 2010 in the Langers Juice S-2 Sportsman Series, which was a championship with fourteen races and those were all at Irwindale Event Center, then known as Toyota Speedway. Lupton managed to win three races and became champion with High Point Racing just two points in front of teammate Roman Lagudi. In 2011, he got two partial rides in the K&N Pro Series West. He drove one race for team owner Greg Rayl and two races for Bill McAnally Racing, including races at All American Speedway and the new Phoenix International Raceway. His best result of the season was 12th place at Montana Raceway Park. In 2013 and 2014, he got a full-time ride at Sunrise Ford Racing in the K&N Pro Series West and became runner-up in 2014 seventeen points behind two-time champion Greg Pursley. He won twice, in 2013 at Evergreen Speedway and in 2014 at Kern County Raceway Park.

On February 16, 2015, it was announced that Lupton had been signed by Athenian Motorsports to compete part-time in the 2015 NASCAR Xfinity Series. Lupton was hired to run a minimum of seven races in the No. 25 starting at Phoenix, with continued sponsorship from Zaxby's. Also that year, Lupton drove in one K&N Pro Series East race at Watkins Glen in order to gain road course experience, because two of his scheduled Xfinity races were the road course races at Road America and Mid-Ohio Sports Car Course. His road course runs were strong, finishing in fourth place in the Watkins Glen East Series race, and then earning his best finishes of the year in his Xfinity schedule with a 9th at Mid-Ohio and a 13th at Road America.

Lupton started the 2016 Xfinity season without a ride, however on March 1, 2016, it was announced that Lupton signed a deal to drive the No. 93 Chevy for RSS Racing for 3 races, starting at Las Vegas. However, the team withdrew from the Vegas race, delaying his debut until the following race at Phoenix, and was replaced by Josh Reaume at Las Vegas.

In 2016, Lupton joined BK Racing to attempt his Sprint Cup Series debut at the Toyota/Save Mart 350. Lupton would finish 35th in the race. He returned to the team at Richmond's Federated Auto Parts 400 in the No. 83. He would be involved in a big wreck, with his car ending up on top of Ryan Newman's car, but he would stay in the race and finish 25th. Lupton made his Truck Series debut at Talladega, driving the No. 02 Chevrolet for Young's Motorsports, he finished 12th. Lupton then made his second Truck Series race at Phoenix, substituting John Wes Townley, earning a 19th-place finish. A week later, Lupton joined Go Fas Racing in a one-race deal at Homestead, finishing 39th.

Lupton ran part-time in the Xfinity Series in 2017 with a limited schedule in No. 24 for JGL Racing, and announced in January 2018 that he and JGL were planning to run 21 races throughout the upcoming Xfinity season (with the hope to run the full schedule if more sponsorship was available). Lupton had a few top 25s but was disappointed for the most part in the other races, failing to finish Daytona, Las Vegas, Fontana, Bristol, Talladega, and Charlotte. He wasn't originally supposed to race in the Bristol race, but with the struggles of Tony Mrakovich in practice, JGL Racing choose Lupton to replace him. JGL shut down after 12 races into the season due to sponsorship issues and team owner James Whitener's health problems.

In June 2019, Lupton returned to the Truck Series for a six-race schedule in DGR-Crosley's No. 5 and No. 15 Toyota Tundras starting at Chicago. He also drove for Young's Motorsports again for one race in their No. 20 at Canadian Tire Motorsport Park. Lupton would not make any NASCAR starts in 2020 until September when he returned to DGR-Crosley, now a Ford team, to drive the No. 17 F-150 at Las Vegas, Texas, as well as make his second ARCA start, driving their No. 17 car in the season-finale at Kansas in October.

On July 6, 2022, it was announced that Lupton would drive the No. 7 for Spire Motorsports in the Truck Series in the race at the Mid-Ohio Sports Car Course.

Personal life
Lupton graduated from the University of North Carolina at Charlotte in 2016 with a degree in finance.

Motorsports career results

NASCAR
(key) (Bold – Pole position awarded by qualifying time. Italics – Pole position earned by points standings or practice time. * – Most laps led.)

Sprint Cup Series

Xfinity Series

Camping World Truck Series

 Season still in progress 
 Ineligible for series points

K&N Pro Series East

ARCA Menards Series
(key) (Bold – Pole position awarded by qualifying time. Italics – Pole position earned by points standings or practice time. * – Most laps led.)

ARCA Menards Series West

References

External links

 
 
 

Living people
1993 births
Racing drivers from Sacramento, California
NASCAR drivers
University of North Carolina at Charlotte alumni
ARCA Menards Series drivers
Kyle Busch Motorsports drivers